West Side Story is the soundtrack album to Steven Spielberg's 2021 film adaptation of the musical of the same name, produced by 20th Century Studios and Amblin Entertainment. The album features music by Leonard Bernstein and lyrics by Stephen Sondheim, with vocals from the film's ensemble cast including Ansel Elgort, Rachel Zegler, Ariana DeBose, David Alvarez, Mike Faist and Rita Moreno, who played Anita in the 1961 film adaptation and plays Valentina (a reworked version of the character Doc) in this film.

The soundtrack was released digitally in Dolby Atmos by Hollywood Records on December 3, 2021 and subsequently released on physical CD on December 10, the same day the film was released in theaters.

Background
Composer David Newman arranged and adapted Bernstein's original score for the film, incorporating a number of alterations originally made to Bernstein's Broadway score by Johnny Green for the 1961 film (e.g., interpolation of the "Cool" fugue motif into the "Prologue" and the extended trumpet solo in "Mambo"). Gustavo Dudamel conducted the New York Philharmonic during the film's recording sessions in 2019, with additional recording by the Los Angeles Philharmonic done during the COVID-19 pandemic the following year. Jeanine Tesori served as vocal coach, while frequent Spielberg collaborator John Williams served as music consultant. The film's version of "Tonight", sung by Rachel Zegler and Ansel Elgort, was released as a digital download single on December 1, 2021.

Alongside the soundtrack, "re-imagined" pop covers were also produced, including "Another Day in America" by Kali Uchis and Ozuna, which was released as a single on November 26 by Interscope Records.

Reception
Like the film, the soundtrack received acclaim from critics and was nominated for the Grammy Award for Best Compilation Soundtrack for Visual Media.

Track listing

Source:

Personnel

 Leonard Bernstein with Irwin Kostal and Sid Ramin – original orchestrations
 Garth Sunderland – additional orchestrations
 Matt Sullivan – music supervisor/soundtrack producer
Gustavo Dudamel – conductor
 Joe E. Rand – music editor
 Ramiro Belgardt – music editor

 Peter Rotter – music contractor
 Steven Spielberg – executive soundtrack producer
 Kristie Macosko Krieger – executive soundtrack producer
 David Newman – arrangements
 Jeanine Tesori – supervising vocal producer
 John Williams – music consultant

Charts

References

2021 soundtrack albums
Hollywood Records soundtracks
Musical film soundtracks
Drama film soundtracks
2020s film soundtrack albums